Sant Shree 1008 Kheteshwar Ji also known as *Aradhya Sant Shiromani Shree 1008 Khetaramji Maharaj*'' (22 April 1912 – 7 May 1984) is a noted saint of Rajasthan.

He belonged to of Rajpurohit community. He became a sanyasin at age 12.He was Born on 22 April 1912 at  kheda village in jalore district in Rajasthan.

His ishta-devata was Brahma. He preached non-violence, chastity, high moral values and conservation of natural resources. He revitalized the importance of spiritual means to achieve self-realization and emphasizing humanity above all other man-made barriers like casteism. He founded the second largest temple of Brahma and named it Brahmadham''' at village Asotra near Balotra in Barmer district in Rajasthan, which second only to the Pushkar temple of Brahma. This is only temple, where Brahma is with his consort Savitri. He empowered the Rajpurohit community by making them realize to work for creating a better community and society. While doing pran-pratishtha ceremony of idols of the temple, Khetheswaraji, he realized, the time has come to leave his earthly body. So, he informed his followers of the same. He took "Samadhi" in name of Lord Brahma on 7 May 1984, a day after the temple was inaugurated by him at Asotra, Rajasthan near the temple and after some months, the white Female Horse which rode, also took samadhi near him.  

There are many followers and temples of him have been built after his death in various towns of Rajasthan by the Rajpurohit community. Every year annual fair and ceremonies are also held on his birth anniversary.

References

1912 births
1984 deaths
Indian Hindu saints
People from Jalore district